Abadi Kheyrabad (also Romanized as Abādī Kheyrābād) is a village in Khabar Rural District, in the Central District of Baft County, Kerman Province, Iran. At the 2006 census, its population was 34, in 10 families.

References 

Populated places in Baft County